George Abbot (29 October 15624 August 1633) was an English divine who was Archbishop of Canterbury from 1611 to 1633. He also served as the fourth Chancellor of the University of Dublin, from 1612 to 1633.

Chambers Biographical Dictionary describes him as "[a] sincere but narrow-minded Calvinist". Among his five brothers, Robert became Bishop of Salisbury and Maurice became Lord Mayor of London. He was a translator of the King James Version of the Bible.

Life and career

Early years
Born at Guildford in Surrey, where his father Maurice Abbot (died 1606) was a cloth worker, he was taught at the Royal Grammar School, Guildford. According to an eighteenth-century biographical dictionary, when Abbot's mother was pregnant with him she had a dream in which she was told that if she ate a pike her child would be a son and rise to great prominence. Some time afterwards she accidentally caught a pike while fetching water from the River Wey and it "being reported to some gentlemen in the neighbourhood, they offered to stand sponsors for the child, and afterwards shewed him many marks of favour". He later studied, and then taught under many eminent scholars, including Dr Thomas Holland, at Balliol College, Oxford, was chosen Master of University College in 1597, and appointed Dean of Winchester in 1600. He was three times Vice-Chancellor of the University, and took a leading part in preparing the authorised version of the New Testament. In 1608, he went to Scotland with George Home, 1st Earl of Dunbar to arrange for a union between the churches of England and Scotland. He so pleased King James in this affair that he was made Bishop of Lichfield and Coventry in 1609 and was translated to the see of London a month afterwards.

Archbishop of Canterbury
On 4 March 1611, Abbot was raised to the position of Archbishop of Canterbury. As archbishop, he defended the apostolic succession of Anglican bishops and the validity of the church's priesthood in 1614. In consequence of the Nag's Head Fable, the archbishop invited certain Roman Catholics to inspect the register in the presence of six of his own episcopal colleagues, the details of which inspection were preserved. It was agreed by all parties that:

In spite of his defence of the catholic nature of the priesthood, his Puritan instincts frequently led him not only into harsh treatment of Roman Catholics, but also into courageous resistance to the royal will, such as when he opposed the scandalous divorce suit of the Lady Frances Howard against Robert Devereux, 3rd Earl of Essex, and again in 1618 when, at Croydon, he forbade the reading of the Declaration of Sports listing the permitted Sunday recreations. He was naturally, therefore, a promoter of the match between the king's daughter, Princess Elizabeth, and Frederick V, Elector Palatine, and a firm opponent of the projected marriage of the new Prince of Wales (later Charles I) and the Spanish Infanta, Maria Anna. This policy brought upon the archbishop the hatred of William Laud (with whom he had previously come into collision at Oxford) and the king's court, although the King himself never forsook Abbot.

In July 1621, while hunting in Lord Zouch's park at Bramshill in Hampshire, a bolt from his cross-bow aimed at a deer happened to strike one of the keepers, who died within an hour, and Abbot was so greatly distressed by the event that he fell into a state of settled melancholia. His enemies maintained that the fatal issue of this accident disqualified him for his office, and argued that, though the homicide was involuntary, the sport of hunting which had led to it was one in which no clerical person could lawfully indulge. The King had to refer the matter to a commission of ten, though he said that "an angel might have miscarried after this sort". The commission was equally divided, and the King gave a casting vote in the Archbishop's favour, though signing also a formal pardon or dispensation. Gustavus Paine notes that Abbot was both the "only translator of the 1611 Bible and the only Archbishop of Canterbury ever to kill a human being".

After this, the Archbishop seldom appeared at the council, chiefly on account of his infirmities. In 1625 he attended the King constantly, however, in his last illness, and performed the ceremony of the coronation of King Charles I as king of England. His refusal to license the assize sermon preached by Dr Robert Sibthorp at Northampton on 22 February 1627, in which cheerful obedience was urged to the king's demand for a general loan, and the duty proclaimed of absolute non-resistance even to the most arbitrary royal commands, led Charles to deprive him of his functions as primate, putting them in commission. The need of summoning parliament, however, soon brought about a nominal restoration of the Archbishop's powers. His presence being unwelcome at court, he lived from that time in retirement, leaving Laud and his party in undisputed ascendancy. He died at Croydon on 4 August 1633, and was buried at Guildford, his native place, where he had endowed Abbot's Hospital with lands to the value of £300 a year.

Legacy

Abbot was a conscientious prelate, though narrow in view and often harsh towards both separatists and Roman Catholics. He wrote a large number of works, the most interesting being his discursive Exposition on the Prophet Jonah (1600), which was reprinted in 1845. His Geography, or a Brief Description of the Whole World (1599), passed through numerous editions. The newest edition, edited by the current Master of the Abbot's Hospital, was published by Goldenford Publishers Ltd on 20 June 2011, to commemorate the 400th anniversary of his enthronement as Archbishop of Canterbury.

Abbot had a large private library of more than 8000 volumes, the majority of which he left to Lambeth Palace Library. Books bearing his armorial stamp can still be found in libraries today.

Guildford remembers the Archbishop with his hospital and a statue in the High Street. A  secondary school and a pub in the High Street are named after him. His tomb can be found in Holy Trinity Church.

Notes

References

External links

 

1562 births
1633 deaths
People from Guildford
17th-century Anglican archbishops
People educated at Royal Grammar School, Guildford
Alumni of Balliol College, Oxford
Archbishops of Canterbury
Bishops of London
Bishops of Lichfield
Chancellors of the University of Dublin
English translators
Vice-Chancellors of the University of Oxford
Masters of University College, Oxford
Translators of the King James Version
17th-century English Anglican priests
English diplomats
Scottish Episcopal Church
Deans of Winchester
Burials in Surrey
English male poets
17th-century Anglican theologians
16th-century Anglican theologians